One Man is the second solo studio album by English musician Mark King, bassist and vocalist of Level 42. It was released in September 1998, more than 14 years after King's previous solo album, Influences. It includes songs co-written by King and Level 42's former guitarist, Boon Gould.

Track listing
All tracks composed by Mark King and Boon Gould; except where indicated.
 "Bitter Moon" – 4:06
 "Swimming with Sky" – 4:47
 "One Man" – 5:22
 "Half Written Songs" – 4:17
 "Pamela" (Mark King) – 2:20
 "Take My Hand" – 4:34
 "Love Wars" – 4:15
 "Resupply" – 3:55
 "If I Had Something..." – 3:51
 "Changing the Guard" (Mark King) – 4:47

Personnel
Mark King – vocals, bass guitar, guitars and synthesizers
Lyndon Connah – Rhodes and acoustic piano
Paul Taylor – Rhodes, acoustic piano, synthesizers and programming
Milton MacDonald – guitars
Mark Jaimes – guitars
Chester Kamen – guitar
Gary Barnacle – alto and soprano saxophone
Geoff Dugmore – drums and percussion
Paul Brown - bass on 2,6,8,10
Miles Bould – percussion
Nicky Brown – backing vocals
Andy Caine – backing vocals

References

1998 albums
Mark King (musician) albums
Virgin Records albums